Amherst Records is an American independent music label, founded in 1957 by the late Leonard Silver, who later on founded Buffalo-based music store Record Theatre. In 1984, Amherst acquired the back catalogs of Avco Records.

Notable artists
 Spyro Gyra
 Glenn Medeiros
 Doc Severinsen
 The Tonight Show Band
 Jackie DeShannon
 David LaFlamme
 Solomon Burke

References

External links
 Amherst Records at Discogs

American independent record labels
Record labels established in 1957